Gorgonidia is a genus of moths in the family Erebidae. The genus was erected by Harrison Gray Dyar Jr. in 1898.

Species
Gorgonidia buckleyi
Gorgonidia cubotaensis
Gorgonidia garleppi
Gorgonidia harterti
Gorgonidia helenae Vincent, 2012
Gorgonidia inversa
Gorgonidia maronensis
Gorgonidia vulcania
Gorgonidia withfordi

References

, 1987: Résultats d'une expédition entomologique privée en Guyane Française, 1986, et description de nouvelles espèces d'arctiides néotropicalis (22e note) (Lepidoptera: Arctiidae). Revue Française de Lépidoptérologie 9 (1): 25-41.
, 2012: A review of the genus Gorgonidia Dyar, 1898, with description of one new species (Lepidoptera: Erebidae: Arctiinae: Arctiini). The European Entomologist 4 (1): 33-54.

Phaegopterina
Moth genera